Kareena "Kaz" Cuthbert (née Marshall) was born 27 January 1987.
Cuthbert is a female field hockey player from Scotland. She has made over 150 appearances for the Women's National Team.

Marshall was born in Paisley and attended Greenock Academy then Glasgow School of Sport, Bellahouston Academy. She had initially been competing at badminton before concentrating on playing hockey. She studied at Glasgow Caledonian University, graduating with a BSc (hons) in Physiotherapy.

Marshall plays club hockey for Western Wildcats, based in Milngavie. She has played in the Commonwealth Games tournament in Dehli & 2018 Commonwealth Games Gold Coast.

Her brother William also plays hockey for Scotland and their mother Judith is a former England international.

Marshall works as a physiotherapist in Glasgow.

References

External links
 profile on Scottish Hockey

1987 births
Living people
People educated at Greenock Academy
Alumni of Glasgow Caledonian University
Scottish female field hockey players
Field hockey players at the 2010 Commonwealth Games
Sportspeople from Paisley, Renfrewshire
Commonwealth Games competitors for Scotland